Peter Turnbull (30 December 1873 – 11 December 1942) was a Scottish professional footballer who played as a centre forward, most notably in the Football League for Burnley and Blackburn Rovers and in the Scottish League for Rangers. Turnbull was described as having an "attitude problem towards authority", which caused his frequent moves between clubs.

Honours 
Rangers
 Glasgow Cup: 1896–97
Brentford
Southern League Second Division: 1900–01

Career statistics

References

1873 births
Scottish footballers
Association football forwards
Rangers F.C. players
Burnley F.C. players
Bolton Wanderers F.C. players
Blackburn Rovers F.C. players
Millwall F.C. players
Queens Park Rangers F.C. players
Brentford F.C. players
Scottish Football League players
English Football League players
Barrow A.F.C. players
Southern Football League players
Tranmere Rovers F.C. players
1942 deaths
Third Lanark A.C. players
People from Sanquhar